La Llorona ("The Weeping Woman" or "The Wailer") is a Mexican mythical vengeful ghost who is said to roam near bodies of water mourning her children whom she drowned.

Origins
Early colonial times provided evidence that the lore is pre-Hispanic, originating in the central highlands. However, La Llorona is most commonly associated with the colonial era and the dynamic between Spanish conquistadores and indigenous women. The most common lore about La Llorona includes her initially being an Indigenous woman who murdered her own children, which she bore from a wealthy Spaniard, after he abandoned her. The villainous qualities of La Llorona, including infanticide and the murdering of one's own blood is assumed to be connected to the narrative surrounding Doña Marina, also known as La Malinche, or Maltinzin in her original nomenclature. Today, the lore of La Llorona is well known in Mexico and the Southwestern United States.

The earliest documentation of La Llorona is traced back to 1550 in Mexico City. But there are theories about her story being connected to specific Aztec mythological creation stories. "The Hungry Woman" includes a wailing woman constantly crying for food, which has been compared to La Llorona's signature nocturnal wailing for her children. The motherly nature of La Llorona's tragedy has been compared to Chihuacoatl, an Aztec goddess deity of motherhood. Her seeking of children to keep for herself is significantly compared to Coatlicue, known as "Our Lady Mother" or Tonantsi (who's also comparable to the Virgen de Guadalupe, another significant mother figure in Mexican-culture), also a monster that devours filth or sin.

The legend of La Llorona is traditionally told throughout Mexico, Central America and northern South America.

Stories of weeping female phantoms are common in the folklore of both Iberian and Amerindian cultures. Out of jealousy over the loss of her own children, Lamia kills other women's children.

The Florentine Codex is an important text that originated in late Mexico in 1519, a quote from which is, "The sixth omen was that many times a woman would be heard going along weeping and shouting. She cried out loudly at night, saying, "Oh my children, we are about to go forever." Sometimes she said, "Oh my children, where am I to take you?"

While the roots of the  legend appear to be pre-Hispanic, the earliest published reference to the legend is a 19th-century sonnet by Mexican poet Manuel Carpio. The poem makes no reference to infanticide, rather  is identified as the ghost of a woman named Rosalia who was murdered by her husband.

Regional versions
The legend has a wide variety of details and versions. In a typical version of the legend, a beautiful woman named María marries a rich ranchero / conquistador to whom she bears two children. One day, María sees her husband with another woman and in a fit of blind rage, she drowns their children in a river, which she immediately regrets. Unable to save them and consumed by guilt, she drowns herself as well but is unable to enter the afterlife, forced to be in purgatory and roam this  earth until she finds her children.
In another version of the story, her children are illegitimate, and she drowns them so that their father cannot take them away to be raised by his new wife. Recurring themes in variations on the  myth include a white, wet dress, nocturnal wailing, and an association with water.

Mexico
Her story is told to children to encourage them not to wander off in the dark and near bodies of water such as rivers and lakes alone. Her spirit is often evoked in artwork, such as that of Alejandro Colunga.  is a yearly waterfront theatrical performance of the legend of  set in the canals of the Xochimilco borough of Mexico City, which was established in 1993 to coincide with the Day of the Dead.

Guatemala 
According to the local legend, in Guatemala City lived a woman who had an affair with a lover. She became pregnant and gave birth to a child named Juan de la Cruz who she drowned so her husband would not know. The woman was condemned in the afterlife to search for her murdered son in every place where there's a pool of water. She does that by crying out for himhence her moniker of the Wailing Woman. It is a popular scary legend that in one iteration or another has been told to generations of children. The terrifying cry of "Oh, my children!!" (¡Ay mis hijos!) is well known due to the story. Additionally, one peculiar detail is that when a person hears the cry from afar means that the ghost is nearby, but if the cry is heard nearby, it means the ghost is afar. Someone unlucky enough to face the specter is "won over" to the afterlife, never to be seen again.

United States
Also told to them is that her cries are heard as she walks around the street or near bodies of water to scare children from wandering around, resembling the stories of El Cucuy.

Venezuela
The tale of La Llorona is set in the Venezuelan Llanos during the colonial period. La Llorona is said to be the spirit of a woman that died of sorrow after her children were killed, either by herself or by her family.
Families traditionally place wooden crosses above their doors to ward off such spirits.

Other mythologies 
In Eastern Europe, the modern Rusalka is a type of water spirit in Slavic mythology. They come to be after a woman drowns due to suicide or murder, especially if they had an unwanted pregnancy. Then they must stay in this world for a period of time.

In popular culture

Film

The story of  first appeared on film in 1933's La Llorona, filmed in Mexico. René Cardona's 1960 film La Llorona was also shot in  Mexico, as was the 1963 horror film, The Curse of the Crying Woman  directed by Rafael Baledón.

The River: The Legend of La Llorona
Revenge of La Llorona
The Wailer: La Llorona
The Curse of La Llorona

 is the primary antagonist in the 2007 movie J-ok'el. In the 2011 Mexican animated film La Leyenda de la Llorona, she is portrayed as a more sympathetic character, whose children die in an accident rather than at their mother's hands.

In the 2017 Pixar film Coco, "La Llorona", the Mexican folk song popularized by Andres Henestrosa in 1941 is sung by Alanna Ubach in her role as Mamá Imelda, joined by Antonio Sol as the singing voice of Ernesto de la Cruz.

In July 2019, James Wan, Gary Dauberman and Emilie Gladstone produced a film titled The Curse of La Llorona for Warner Bros. Pictures. The film was directed by Michael Chaves and stars Linda Cardellini, Raymond Cruz, Patricia Velasquez and Marisol Ramirez as La Llorona.

Also in 2019, Jayro Bustamante directed the Guatemalan film La Llorona, starring María Mercedes Coroy, which screened in the Contemporary World Cinema section at the 2019 Toronto International Film Festival.

The Legend of La Llorona was a film released in January 2022 and stars Danny Trejo, Autumn Reeser, and Antonio Cupo.

Theater
The play premiered at California State University, Northridge's Little Theatre in 1995.

Literature

The  novel Paola Santiago and the River of Tears, the first part of a young adult trilogy by Tehlor Kay Mejia, is based on the legend of La Llorona. Also La Llorona was portrayed by a story, by the TV show called the Grimm.

Music
"La Llorona" is a Mexican folk song popularized by Andres Henestrosa in 1941. It has since been covered by various musicians, including Chavela Vargas, Joan Baez, and Lila Downs.

North American singer-songwriter Lhasa de Sela's debut album La Llorona (1997) explored the dark mysteries of Latin folklore. She combined a variety of musical genres including klezmer, gypsy jazz and Mexican folk music, all in the Spanish language. The album was certified Platinum in Canada, and it earned her a Canadian Juno Award for Best Global Artist in 1998.

Manic Hispanic, a rock band from Los Angeles, California, have a song titled "She Turned Into Llorona" on their 2003 album Mijo Goes To Jr. College.

Television
 is an antagonist in the TV series Supernatural, portrayed by Sarah Shahi in the pilot episode and by Shanae Tomasevich in "Moriah" and season 15.

 is an antagonist in a 2012 second-season episode of the TV series Grimm.

 appears in the Victor and Valentino episode "The Lonely Haunts 3: La Llorona" voiced by Vanessa Marshall. Contrary to the usual depictions, this version of La Llorona is good and simply lonely and claims to have had twenty kids who had all grown up and left her; implying that she suffers from Empty nest syndrome.

 appears in the Craig of the Creek episode "The Legend of the Library" voiced by Carla Tassara. Craig and the Stump Kids visit their friend Stacks at the local library to get out of the rain. When the power goes out and their fellow Creek Kids begin disappearing, Stacks believes that La Llorona is to blame. In the end, it is revealed that the "ghost" was actually Lorraine, the substitute librarian who is very serious about her job. She makes the kids promise to take good care of the library along with a warning, showing a ghostly face at the same time. Whether or not Lorraine was in fact La Llorona or the face was imagined is left ambiguous.

 appears in the Riverdale (2017 TV series) episode "Chapter 97: Ghost Stories". The characters tell ghost stories about people related to them or the town that had died. La Llorona is one. She haunts Sweetwater River and she also manages to possess Toni and take Betty's unborn child away.

See also

References

Bibliography
Perez, Domino Renee. (2008). There Was a Woman: La Llorona from Folklore to Popular Culture. Austin: U of Texas Press. ISBN 978-0292718128.
Mathews, Holly F. 1992. The directive force of morality tales in a Mexican community. In Human motives and cultural models, edited by R.G.D'Andrade and C. Strauss, 127–62. New York: Cambridge University Press.

Ray John de Aragon, The Legend of La Llorona, Sunstone Press, 2006. .
Belinda Vasquez Garcia, The Witch Narratives Reincarnation, Magic Prose Publishing, 2012. 

 
Mythology of the Americas
Mexican ghosts
Female legendary creatures

pt:A bela da meia-noite